The Bangsamoro Republik, officially the United Federated States of Bangsamoro Republik (UFSBR), was a short-lived, self-proclaimed, unrecognized breakaway state in the Philippines. Nur Misuari, chairman of the Moro National Liberation Front, issued the Proclamation of Bangsamoro Independence on July 27, 2013 in Talipao, Sulu and declared the capital of Bangsamoro to be Davao City.

History
According to Misuari, the republic's territory encompasses the islands of Basilan, Mindanao, Palawan, Sulu and Tawi-Tawi where the Bangsamoro traditionally lived. However, according to Misuari's legal counsel, Emmanuel Fontanilla, the state also encompasses the Malaysian state of Sabah and Sarawak.

This declaration of independence, which was made under the authority of the United Nations General Assembly 1514 resolution of 1960 granting independence to all colonized countries, escalated into the Zamboanga City crisis. The MNLF, the group which proclaimed Bangsamoro, is an observer of the Organisation of Islamic Cooperation.

As of September 28, 2013, with the defeat in Zamboanga City by the Philippine government, the MNLF no longer controls any territory openly anywhere and the Bangsamoro Republic has been debilitated. However, the MNLF has not renounced its bid for the independence of the Bangsamoro Republik.

Etymology 
The term Bangsamoro comes from combining the word bangsa, meaning nation or people, and the Spanish word moro, which was originally applied to the Moors that ruled Spain prior to the Reconquista, and was subsequently applied to predominantly Muslim Malay tribes.

Background

Earlier declarations

An independent state of Bangsamoro Republik was first declared on April 28, 1974, two months after the siege of Jolo, Sulu after the MNLF first attempted to raise their flag.

Zamboanga City crisis

MNLF commander Asamin Hussin stated in September 2013 that his group would only release some 200 civilian hostages held in Barangay Kasanyangan once they are allowed to proceed to Zamboanga city hall and hoist their flag in front of it.
During the crisis, the MNLF did not manage to gain de facto control  of three districts of Zamboanga City.

Present
, Nur Misuari was the UFSBR's Interim President according to the MNLF. A government in exile for the Bangsamoro has also been considered by Misuari.

See also
 Flag of the Bangsamoro Republik
 Moro National Liberation Front
 Moro Islamic Liberation Front
 Framework Agreement on the Bangsamoro
 Peace process with the Bangsamoro in the Philippines
 Bangsamoro Organic Law

References

 
Separatism in the Philippines
Independence movements
States and territories established in 2013
States and territories disestablished in 2013
Former unrecognized countries
2013 establishments in the Philippines
2013 disestablishments in the Philippines
Moro National Liberation Front